Major League Baseball on Mutual was the de facto title of the Mutual Broadcasting System's (MBS) national radio coverage of Major League Baseball games. Mutual's coverage came about during the Golden Age of Radio in the 1930s, 1940s, and 1950s. During this period, television sports broadcasting was in its infancy, and radio was still the main form of broadcasting baseball. For many years, Mutual was the national radio broadcaster for baseball's All-Star Game and World Series.

History of coverage
In 1949, Commissioner Happy Chandler negotiated a seven-year, US$4,370,000 contract with the Gillette Safety Razor Company and the Mutual Broadcasting System for radio rights to the World Series, with the proceeds going directly into the pension fund. In , NBC replaced Mutual as the exclusive national radio broadcaster for the World Series and All-Star Game.

Following the lead of the rival Liberty Broadcasting System, Mutual also aired regular-season Game of the Day broadcasts (a precursor to television's Game of the Week concept) to non-major-league cities throughout the 1940s and 1950s.

Attempts at television coverage
In 1950, Mutual acquired the television broadcast rights to the World Series and All-Star Game for the next six years. The network may have been re-indulging in TV network dreams or simply taking advantage of a long-standing business relationship; in either case, the broadcast rights were sold to NBC in time for the following season's games at an enormous profit.

Announcers

Game of the Day
 Rex Barney (1956)
 Bud Blattner (1952; 1954)
 Dizzy Dean (1951–1952)
 Gene Elston (1958–1960)
 Bob Feller (1958)
 Bob Fulton (1954)
 Art Gleeson (1950–1958)
 Al Helfer (1950–1954)
 Gene Kirby (1950–1952)
 France Laux (1939–1941; 1944)
 John MacLean (1955–1960)
 Bob Neal (1955–1956)
 Mel Ott (1955)
 Van Patrick (1960)
 Hal Totten (1945–1950)
 Bob Wolff (1950–1951)

World Series

1950s

1940s

 Mutual also nationally broadcast the 1948 American League tie-breaker game. It did not air in Cleveland due to Indians owner Bill Veeck refusing to grant permission to Mutual affiliate WHK after MLB commissioner Happy Chandler selected Mel Allen for the Series coverage instead of either Cleveland announcer. Indians flagship WJW originated coverage of their own for the tie-breaker game.

1930s

All-Star Game

1950s

1940s

Two nights following the 1942 All-Star Game, the American League All-Stars traveled to Cleveland Municipal Stadium in Cleveland, Ohio, to play a special benefit game against a team of players from the U.S. Army and Navy. The contest, which the American Leaguers won 5–0, attracted a crowd of 62,094 and netted $70,000 for the Army Emergency Relief Fund and the Navy Relief Society. Mutual Radio broadcast the second game, with Bob Elson, Waite Hoyt, and Jack Graney announcing.

1930s

References

Mutual
American sports radio programs
Mutual Broadcasting System programs
1930s American radio programs
1940s American radio programs
1950s American radio programs